The Bucked Up 200 was a 134-lap, 200-mile long NASCAR Camping World Truck Series race that takes place at Las Vegas Motor Speedway.

History

The race was first held on November 3, 1996 as the Carquest 420K. The race continued annually until 2000, when the race was removed from the schedule. However, the race returned as the Orleans 350 in 2001.

In 2011, the race was moved to October as part of the IndyCar weekend and became an afternoon race.

In 2012, the race was originally set for October 13 at 12 noon PDT as part of the IndyCar weekend, but Indy Racing League LLC faced issues from the 2011 IZOD IndyCar World Championship, with Truck race being that race's Saturday event, but the IndyCar race was removed as a result of legal issues following the death of Dan Wheldon on Lap 11 of the IndyCar race. As a result, it moved back to late September as a stand-alone race and returned to night time.

For the 2018 race, now known as the Stratosphere 200, the event was shortened to 201 miles and 134 laps. The race was also moved from September to be a part of the track's March tripleheader.

The race name was changed to the Strat 200 for 2019. In 2020, the race was moved to the second round of the season.

Bucked Up acquired naming rights to the event in 2021.

When the 2022 schedule was released, it was announced that the race would not return, and Las Vegas would be only host one truck race.

Past winners

1998, 2005, and 2008: Races extended due to NASCAR overtime.

Multiple winners (drivers)

Multiple winners (Teams)

Manufacturer wins

References

External links
 

NASCAR Truck Series races
 
Annual sporting events in the United States
1996 establishments in Nevada
Recurring sporting events established in 1996